Gonianotini is a tribe of dirt-colored seed bugs in the family Rhyparochromidae. There are more than 20 genera and 140 described species in Gonianotini.

Genera
These 22 genera belong to the tribe Gonianotini:

 Alampes Horvath, 1884
 Aoploscelis Fieber, 1861
 Aphanus Laporte & de Castelnau, 1832
 Armenoecus Kiritshenko & Scudder, 1973
 Atrazonotus Slater & Ashlock, 1966
 Bleteogonus Reuter, 1885
 Claudinerobius Brailovsky, 1978
 Delochilocoris Bergroth, 1893
 Diomphalus Fieber, 1864
 Emblethis Fieber, 1861
 Facicoris Kiritshenko & Scudder, 1973
 Gonianotus Fieber, 1861
 Hyalocoris Jakovlev, 1874
 Ischnopeza Fieber, 1861
 Macrodema Fieber, 1861
 Malezonotus Barber, 1918
 Neurocladus Fieber, 1861
 Parapolycrates Reuter, 1885
 Pionosomus Fieber, 1861
 Pterotmetus Amyot & Serville, 1843
 Spinigernotus Scudder, 1984
 Trapezonotus Fieber, 1861

References

Further reading

External links

 

Rhyparochromidae
Articles created by Qbugbot